Top Race V6 is a touring car race series held in Argentina. It was founded in 1997.

The cars
The Top Race V6 category sees the vehicles presented in silhouette form, with identical, strictly controlled mechanical specifications. Body styles currently running in the series are the Ford Mondeo, Chevrolet Vectra (aka Vauxhall/Opel Astra), Peugeot 407, Mercedes C-Class and Volkswagen Passat, all in sedan form. In previous seasons, Renault Laguna and Citroën C5 bodies were also used.

Engines are identical 3.0 litre V6 units tuned by Kit Berta to produce approximately 350 hp. Chassis (tubular steel), suspension (control front, independent rear), tires (Pirelli PZero slicks on 18 inch cast aluminium wheels) and gearboxes (Mark Saenz H-Pattern 5 speed) are all identical control items. The vehicles also run a uniform body kit consisting of front splitter/air dam, side skirts, and rear wing. Body modifications are allowed to present a more race oriented look (such as flared wheel arches and widened bodies), but this is also strictly controlled to keep all the vehicles even.

As a result, racing is cost effective as well as being close and highly competitive.

Champions

Former Top Race

Top Race V6

Support series

Point system 

The points are given in the following order:

External links 

 
Article about Top Race in Kicker China 

 
Recurring sporting events established in 1997